Parascolopsis inermis, commonly known as unarmed dwarf monocle bream, is a fish native to the Indian and western Pacific Oceans.

References

Russell, B.C., 1990. FAO Species Catalogue. Vol. 12. Nemipterid fishes of the world. (Threadfin breams, whiptail breams, monocle breams, dwarf monocle breams, and coral breams). Family Nemipteridae. An annotated and illustrated catalogue of nemipterid species known to date. FAO Fish. Synop. 125(12):149p. Rome: FAO

Fish of Thailand
Fish of Japan
Fish of the Pacific Ocean
Fish of the Indian Ocean
Taxa named by Coenraad Jacob Temminck
Taxa named by Hermann Schlegel
Fish described in 1843
Nemipteridae